The Aliens are a Scottish band consisting of former Beta Band members Gordon Anderson (aka Lone Pigeon, lead vocals, guitar), John Maclean (keyboards, backing vocals) and Robin Jones (drums, backing vocals). They have two albums, two EP's and a number of singles. Their debut album, Astronomy for Dogs charted at #46 in the UK Album Chart in 2007.

History 
They formed in 2005 after Maclean and Jones had left The Beta Band the previous year and asked Anderson to join their new project. Anderson had been part of an early incarnation of the Beta Band and had been friends with Maclean since their school-going days in St Andrews. He described the friendship as "Gordon keeps you on your toes with his misbehaviour. Fifty percent of the time we’re like two fighting siblings. The other fifty percent of the time it’s like I’m a dad and he’s a child".

Their first release, the EP Alienoid Starmonica, recorded by John Williamson, was released to the UK iTunes Music Store on 20 March 2006, and on CD and 12" on 8 May 2006 on their own EMI imprint, Pet Rock. The majority of the material was originally written by Anderson. The band made their touring debut in November of that year.

The Aliens released their first album, Astronomy for Dogs recorded by John Williamson, on 19 March 2007. The album was recorded in The Cave, the small recording space beneath the Forest Cafe in Edinburgh before being put onto disc at Olympic Studios in London. The band produced it themselves. The release was timed to coincide with a ten-date UK tour but this had to be canceled due to Gordon Anderson breaking his clavicle climbing up a tree. The tour was rescheduled to May/June of that same year. In October 2007 they toured North America.

In spring of 2008, the band cancelled all shows except their festival appearances due to the increasing ill health of Gordon Anderson during the recording of the second album; however, on his recovery the band completed a string of UK festival dates in July. The new album, Luna was released on 29 September 2008 and was preceded by the single "Magic Man", released on 22 September.

On 4 July 2019 The Aliens once again became active on social media. The live album 'Live on the Moon' was released on CD on 29 November 2019, a limited run vinyl edition followed in February 2020. On 20/02/2020 The Aliens released their first new material since their initial split in 2008, publishing 'BB, WDYLM' on Youtube.

Discography

Albums
Astronomy for Dogs (19 March 2007)
Luna (29 September 2008)
 Electronville (2 October 2020)
 Back to Beyond (5 March 2021)

Live Album
Live on the Moon (29 November 2019)

EPs
Alienoid Starmonica (8 May 2006)
The Sunlamp Show EP (18 May 2009)

Singles
"The Happy Song" (18 September 2006)
"Setting Sun" (5 March 2007)
"Robot Man"  (25 June 2007)
"Magic Man"  (22 September 2008)

References

External links
The Aliens official website
Beta Band fansite featuring latest news on The Aliens
The Aliens video session on Vic Galloway Show on Radio Scotland - 6 October 2008

Scottish rock music groups
Musical groups established in 2005